Fibrobacterota is a small bacterial phylum which includes many of the major rumen bacteria, allowing for the degradation of plant-based cellulose in ruminant animals. Members of this phylum were categorized in other phyla.  The genus Fibrobacter (the only genus of Fibrobacterota) was removed from the genus Bacteroides in 1988.

Phylogeny and Comparative Genomic Studies 

Although Fibrobacterota, which consists of a single genus Fibrobacter containing two species, is currently recognized as a distinct phylum, phylogenetic studies based RpoC and Gyrase B protein sequences, indicate that Fibrobacter succinogenes is closely related to the species from the phyla Bacteroidetes and Chlorobi. The species from these three phyla also branch in the same position based upon conserved signature indels in a number of important proteins. Lastly and most importantly, comparative genomic studies have identified two conserved signature indels (a 5-7 amino acid insert in the RpoC protein and a 13-16 amino acid insertion in serine hydroxymethyltransferase) and one signature protein (PG00081) that are uniquely shared by all of the species from these three phyla. All of these results provide compelling evidence that the species from these three phyla shared a common ancestor exclusive of all other bacteria and it has been proposed that they should all recognized as part of a single “FCB”superphylum.

Phylogeny
Phylogeny of Fibrobacterota.

Taxonomy
The currently accepted taxonomy is based on the List of Prokaryotic names with Standing in Nomenclature (LSPN) and the National Center for Biotechnology Information (NCBI).

 Class Chitinispirillia Sorokin et al. 2016
 Order Chitinispirillales Sorokin et al. 2016]
 Family Chitinispirillaceae Sorokin et al. 2016
 Genus Chitinispirillum Sorokin et al. 2016 
 Species C. alkaliphilum Sorokin et al. 2016
 Class Chitinivibrionia Sorokin et al. 2014
 Order Chitinivibrionales Sorokin et al. 2014
 Family Chitinivibrionaceae Sorokin et al. 2014
 Genus Chitinivibrio Sorokin et al. 2014
 Species C. alkaliphilus Sorokin et al. 2014
 Class Fibrobacteria  Spain et al. 2012
 Order Fibrobacterales Spain et al. 2012 ["Fibromonadales" Abdul Rahman et al. 2016]
 Family Fibrobacteraceae Spain et al. 2012 [Fibromonadaceae" Abdul Rahman et al. 2016]
 Genus "Hallerella" Wylensek et al. 2020
 Species "H. porci" Wylensek et al. 2021
 Species "H. succinigenes" Wylensek et al. 2020
 Genus "Candidatus Fibromonas" Abdul Rahman et al. 2016
 Species "Ca. F. termitidis" Abdul Rahman et al. 2016
 Genus Fibrobacter Montgomery et al. 1988
 Species F. intestinalis Montgomery et al. 1988
 Species F. succinogenes (Hungate 1950) Montgomery et al. 1988
 Subspecies F. s. elongatus Montgomery et al. 1988
 Subspecies F. s. succinogenes (Hungate 1950) Montgomery et al. 1988

Distribution
The phylum Fibrobacterota is considered to be closely related to the CFB [Cytophaga-Flavibacterium-Bacteroidota]. The only genus in this phylum is Fibrobacter that contains strains from the guts of many mammals including cattle and pigs. The two described species in this genus namely, Fibrobacter succinogenes and Fibrobacter intestinalis are important members of fibrolytic communities in mammalian guts and have received a lot of attention in recent decades due to the long-standing interest microbes capable of degrading plant fiber.

Molecular evidence based on the amplification of 16rRNA genes from various environments suggest that the phylum is much more widespread than previously thought. Most of the clones from mammalian environments group along with the known isolates in what has been called subphylum 1. Members of subphylum 2 however, have so far been found only in the gut of termites. and in some litter-feeding cockroaches. The predominance of subphylum 2 in cellulolytic fibre-associated bacterial communities in hindguts of wood-feeding Nasutitermes corniger suggests that they play an important role in the breakdown of plant material in higher termites.

See also
 Fibrobacter succinogenes
 Candidate phylum TG3
 List of bacterial orders
 List of bacteria genera

References

External links
 List of Prokaryotic Names with Standing in Nomenclature - Genus Fibrobacter
 Systema Naturae 2000 Classification: Phylum Fibrobacteres 

Bacteria phyla